The 1949–50 season was the 2nd season of competitive football in Israel and the 24th season under the Israeli Football Association, established in 1928, during the British Mandate.

IFA Competitions

League competitions

Israeli League

The league competition, which started in the Previous season, finished during the season. Maccabi Tel Aviv won the inaugural Israeli championship. 
Maccabi Nes Tziona finished bottom of the league and was due to be relegated. However, as disagreement broke out between the Hapoel and Maccabi factions in the IFA, the next league season didn't start until fall 1951, the club's relegation, which was part of the disagreement, wasn't confirmed until mid-1951.

Liga Meuhedet

Hapoel Kiryat Haim, Hapoel Hadera, Maccabi Ramat Gan, Bnei Yehuda and Hapoel Jerusalem
As the IFA established the league system, 25 teams were placed in Liga Bet. As the placing of teams to Liga Bet was part of the disagreements between the two IFA factions (with each wants more of its own teams in Liga Alef and Liga Bet), the teams placed in Liga Bet were selected not only based on placing in Liga Meuhedet.

National teams

National team

1950 World Cup qualification (group 3), first round

1949–50 matches

References

 
Seasons in Israeli football